Eugenio Arriaza was a Cuban  lawyer and poet born in Havana in the first third of the nineteenth century.

A mediocre poet, he had the odd idea of adapting the novel Don Quixote onto ottava rima (1849) which was received with unanimously bad reviews. He also wrote the better received Law book Ensayo sobre el Origen, Naturaleza y Funcionamiento de los Promotores Fiscales.

References
Enciclopedia universal ilustrada europeo-americana, book 25.

19th-century Cuban lawyers
19th-century births
19th-century Cuban poets
Works based on Don Quixote
Cuban male poets
People from Havana
Year of death missing